San Benigno Canavese railway station serves the town and comune of San Benigno Canavese, in the Piedmont region, northwestern Italy.

Since 2012 it serves line SFM1, part of the Turin metropolitan railway service.

Services

References

Railway stations in the Metropolitan City of Turin
San Benigno Canavese